Zakrzów may refer to:

Zakrzów, Głogów County in Lower Silesian Voivodeship (south-west Poland)
Zakrzów, Oleśnica County in Lower Silesian Voivodeship (south-west Poland)
Zakrzów, Środa Śląska County in Lower Silesian Voivodeship (south-west Poland)
Zakrzów, Łódź Voivodeship (central Poland)
Zakrzów, Łęczna County in Lublin Voivodeship (east Poland)
Zakrzów, Opole Lubelskie County in Lublin Voivodeship (east Poland)
Zakrzów, Tarnów County in Lesser Poland Voivodeship (south Poland)
Zakrzów, Wadowice County in Lesser Poland Voivodeship (south Poland)
Zakrzów, Wieliczka County in Lesser Poland Voivodeship (south Poland)
Zakrzów, Jędrzejów County in Świętokrzyskie Voivodeship (south-central Poland)
Zakrzów, Kazimierza County in Świętokrzyskie Voivodeship (south-central Poland)
Zakrzów, Pińczów County in Świętokrzyskie Voivodeship (south-central Poland)
Zakrzów, Sandomierz County in Świętokrzyskie Voivodeship (south-central Poland)
Zakrzów, Włoszczowa County in Świętokrzyskie Voivodeship (south-central Poland)
Zakrzów, Kędzierzyn-Koźle County in Opole Voivodeship (south-west Poland)
Zakrzów, Krapkowice County in Opole Voivodeship (south-west Poland)
Zakrzów, Tarnobrzeg, Podkarpackie Voivodeship